Habu Dam(羽布ダム) is a gravity dam located in Aichi Prefecture in Japan. The dam is used for irrigation. The catchment area of the dam is 51.3 km2. The dam impounds about 107  ha of land when full and can store 19363 thousand cubic meters of water. The construction of the dam was completed in 1962.

References

Dams in Aichi Prefecture
1962 establishments in Japan